The Bundesstraße 31 (B 31) is a federal highway or Bundesstraße running from east to west in South Germany. It runs from Breisach on the border with France to the Sigmarszell junction on the Bundesautobahn 96 (A 96) near Lindau. Between the transition of the Bundesautobahn 98 (A 98) to the B 31 near the Stockach-Ost exit and Sigmarszell junction on the A 96 it is part of the E 54 from Paris to Munich.

Route 
Important places on  the B 31 and junctions with other long distance roads:
 Breisach am Rhein (federal border D 415 - to 2006 N415)
 Freiburg im Breisgau (A 5, B 3)
 Kirchzarten
 Buchenbach
 Hinterzarten (B 500)
 Titisee-Neustadt (B 317)
 Löffingen (two petrol stations on the B 31, Schwarzwaldpark, Wutachschlucht)
 Hüfingen (B 27)
 Donaueschingen (B 33)
 Geisingen (A 81, B 311)
 Engen (B 491)
 Stockach (A 98, B 14)
 Überlingen
 Uhldingen-Mühlhofen
 Meersburg (B 33)
 Friedrichshafen (B 30)
 Kressbronn am Bodensee (B 467)
 Weißensberg (B 12)
 Sigmarszell (A 96, B 308)
 Lindau (Bodensee)

See also 
 List of federal highways in Germany

Literature 
 Daniel Schneider: Die Entwicklungsgeschichte der B 31 zwischen Freiburg im Breisgau und Breisach am Rhein, in: Walter Laub/Bernhard Kenk/Daniel Schneider: Die B 31-West ...in und um Umkirch herum. Umkirch, 2007, pp. 7-20.

External links 

 www.dreisamufer.de (History of the B 31)
 Report of the construction of the B31 Ost

References 

031
031
031
Tuttlingen (district)
Lindau (district)
Bodenseekreis
Breisgau-Hochschwarzwald
31